Lewis Johnstone may refer to:

 Lew Johnstone (1916–1983), Australian politician
 Lewis Wilkieson Johnstone (1862–1936), Canadian politician